Belmont is the debut album by American pop punk band Belmont. The album was released on August 17, 2018 through Mutant League Records.

The album charted on three Billboard charts.

Track listing

Personnel 
Belmont
Taz Johnson – lead vocals
Brian Lada – drums
Sam Patt – lead guitars, vocals
Alex Wieringa – bass, vocals
Jason Inguagiato – rhythm guitar

Charts

References

External links 
 
 

2018 debut albums
Belmont (band) albums